Mary Reilly may refer to:

 Mary Reilly (novel), a 1990 novel by Valerie Martin
 Mary Reilly (film), a 1996 film based on the novel
 Mary Reilly (academic), an Irish neurologist'
 Mary Reilly (advocate), a Catholic teacher, leader, advocate, and Sister of Mercy from South Providence, Rhode Island
 Mary McMullen (1920–1986), pseudonym for author Mary Reilly

See also
 Mary Riley (disambiguation)